Lock-Sport-Krock is Nikola Sarcevic's debut solo album.  This folk rock album is a marked departure from Sarcevic's work with his punk rock band Millencolin.  The album produced one single, Lovetrap.

Track listing 
"Lovetrap" (MP3) - 3:15
"Viola" - 3:21
"Nobody Without You" - 3:33
"Lock-Sport-Krock" - 3:05
"Glue Girl" - 2:55
"You Make My World Go Around" - 2:17
"New Fool" - 3:18
"Goodbye, I Die" - 3:40
"Mirror Man" - 2:34
"My Aim Is You" - 3:16
"Vila Rada" - 3:22

Lineup 
Nikola Sarcević - Vocals, Guitars

Guest Musicians:
Henke Wind - Guitars, Bass, Grand Piano, Piano, Organ, Percussion, Background vocals.
Thomas Falk - Drums.
Fredrik Sandsten - Drums.
Branko Sarcevic - Guitars.
Fia Lindgren - Background Vocals.
Andreas Hartman - Harmonica.
Jonas Lindén - Harmonica.
Mieszko Talarczyk - Kickdrum.
Lisa Lindén - Handclap.

External links
Page at BurningHeart.com

2004 debut albums